MTK Budapest is a Hungarian women's handball team from Budapest, that is part of the multi-sports club MTK Budapest. The team plays in the Nemzeti Bajnokság I, the top level championship in Hungary.

Kits

Team

Current squad
Squad for the 2022–23 season
 Head coach: Attila Vágó
 Goalkeeping coach: Péter Rutka
 Doctor: István Tatai, MD
 Masseur: Dániel Sándor

Goalkeepers
 16  Sára Suba
 54  Barbara Győri
Right wingers
 31  Eszter Juhász
 88  Vivien Grosch
 Left wingers
 11  Nikolett Sallai
 13  Orsolya Pelczéder
Line players
 8  Laura Szabó
 39  Noémi Dakos (c)

Back players
Left backs
 17  Adrienn Mészáros-Mihálffy
 18  Petra Koronczai 
 30  Csilla Mazák-Németh
  Tamara Kobela
Centre backs
 3  Kitti Szabó
 14  Tamara Pál
 38  Petra Simon
 66  Dorina Román
Right backs
 10  Anna Kekezović

Transfers
Transfers for the 2023–24 season

Joining
  Johanna Farkas (CB) (from  Dunaújvárosi Kohász KA)
  Lilly Török (LP) (from  Siófok KC)
  Luca Poczetnyik (LB) (from  Dunaújvárosi Kohász KA)
  Flóra Andróczki (RW) (from  Békéscsabai Előre NKSE)
  Bozsana Fekete (LW) (from  Érd HC)

Leaving
  Tamara Pál (CB) (to  SCM Gloria Buzău)
  Laura Szabó (P) (to  BSV Sachsen Zwickau)
  Vivien Grosch (RW) (to  Debreceni VSC)

Coaches 

Vlagyimir Golovin (2015–2021)
Gergő Vida (2021–2022)
Marinko Kekezović (2022)
Attila Vágó (2022–)

European record

EHF European League

Notable players 

  Gréta Márton
  Noémi Háfra
  Alexandra Wolf
  Eszter Tóth
  Éva Barna
  Nóra Valovics
  Luca Szekerczés
  Szandra Szöllősi-Zácsik
  Fruzsina Dávid-Azari
  Petra Blazek
  Ines Khouildi
  Lana Frankovic
  Liliia Gorilska
  Olha Nikolayenko
  Elena Abramovich
  Martina Baciková
  Djurdjina Malovic

References

External links
 Official website

Hungarian handball clubs
Sport in Budapest